Banchette is a comune (municipality) in the Metropolitan City of Turin in the Italian region Piedmont, located about  northeast of Turin.

Banchette borders the following municipalities: Ivrea, Fiorano Canavese, Salerano Canavese, Samone, and Pavone Canavese.

Sights include Banchette Castle, built from the 14th century, and the parish church of San Cristoforo.

Twin towns — sister cities
Banchette is twinned with:

  Septème, France

References

Cities and towns in Piedmont